Roi Et Airport  is an airport serving Roi Et, the capital city of Roi Et Province, Thailand.

The Airport is located at 135 Moo 2, Roi Et, Phon Thong Road. (Highway 2044), Nong Phok Subdistrict and approximately 11 kilometres from the city.

The Airport consists of a passenger terminal measuring 3,013 square meters, the arrival and departure gates are on the same floor, a runway (runway) 45 x 2,100 meters, and an apron measuring 85 x 324 meters, which can accommodate Boeing 737 or Airbus A320 aircraft.

The airport currently serves flights to both Don Mueang International Airport and Suvarnabhumi Airport in Bangkok.

History 
Originally the airport was a military airfield which is under the supervision of the Royal Thai Army.

In 1989, the Department of Air Transport approved the construction of Roi Et Airport. Allocated a budget of 601,916.983.98 baht. Construction of the airport began on August 11, 1995 and completed in 1999. Construction took approximately 3 years with an area of approximately 2,700 rai. The runway is 2,100 meters long. 45 meters wide, 60 meters long on each side, 45 meters wide, the taxiway is 23 meters wide, 10.5 meters wide on each side, the general terrain is plains and grasslands. The airport officially opened on March 2, 1999.

As of 2022, there is 1 airline that provide service, Thai AirAsia which commenced daily flights to Don Mueang Airport.

Thai Smile did operating daily flights to Suvarnabhumi Airport since January 2022, and stop the flights September 2022.

Expansion 
In 2020, Roi Et airport, would receive 110 million baht to raise its annual handling capacity to 750,000 passengers.

Roi Et airport has commenced it's expansion and renovation project which is currently under construction. This project will increase a passenger handling capacity of the airport to 1.2 million passengers per year and the project will complete in December, 2022.

Airlines and destinations

References

External links

  Roi Et AirportHomepage
 
 

Airports in Thailand
Buildings and structures in Roi Et province
Airports established in 1999